Sir Geoffrey William Hill, FRSL (18 June 1932 – 30 June 2016) was an English poet, professor emeritus of English literature and religion, and former co-director of the Editorial Institute, at Boston University. Hill has been considered to be among the most distinguished poets of his generation and was called the "greatest living poet in the English language." 
From 2010 to 2015 he held the position of Professor of Poetry in the University of Oxford. Following his receiving the Truman Capote Award for Literary Criticism in 2009 for his Collected Critical Writings, and the publication of Broken Hierarchies (Poems 1952–2012), Hill is recognised as one of the principal contributors to poetry and criticism in the 20th and 21st centuries.

Biography
Geoffrey Hill was born in Bromsgrove, Worcestershire, England, in 1932, the son of a police constable. When he was six, his family moved to nearby Fairfield in Worcestershire, where he attended the local primary school, then the grammar school in Bromsgrove. "As an only child, he developed the habit of going for long walks alone, as an adolescent deliberating and composing poems as he muttered to the stones and trees." On these walks he often carried with him Oscar Williams' A Little Treasury of Modern Poetry (1946), and Hill speculates: "there was probably a time when I knew every poem in that anthology by heart."  

In 1950, he was admitted to Keble College, Oxford, to read English, where he published his first poems in 1952, at the age of twenty, in an eponymous Fantasy Press volume (though he had published work in the Oxford Guardian—the magazine of the University Liberal Club—and The Isis).

Upon graduation from Oxford with a first, Hill embarked on an academic career, teaching at the University of Leeds from 1954 until 1980, from 1976 as professor of English Literature. After leaving Leeds, he spent a year at the University of Bristol on a Churchill Scholarship before becoming a teaching fellow at Emmanuel College, Cambridge, where he taught from 1981 until 1988. 

He then moved to the United States, to serve as University Professor and Professor of Literature and Religion at Boston University. In 2000, with Christopher Ricks, he was co-founder of the Editorial Institute at Boston University, dedicated to training students in editorial method. In 2006, he moved back to Cambridge, England.

Marriages
Hill was married twice. His first marriage to Nancy Whittaker, which produced four children, Julian, Andrew, Jeremy and Bethany, ended in divorce. His second marriage to the American librettist, and Anglican priest, Alice Goodman occurred in 1987.  The couple had a daughter, Alberta. The marriage lasted until Hill's death. Hill was a Christian.

Awards and honours
Mercian Hymns won the Alice Hunt Bartlett Prize and the inaugural Whitbread Award for Poetry in 1971. Hill won as well the Eric Gregory Award in 1961.

Hill delivered the 1998 Warton Lecture on English Poetry.

Hill was awarded an honorary D.Litt. degree by the University of Leeds in 1988, the same year he received an Ingram Merrill Foundation Award. He was also an Honorary Fellow of Keble College, Oxford; an Honorary Fellow of Emmanuel College, Cambridge; a Fellow of the Royal Society of Literature; and a Fellow of the American Academy of Arts and Sciences. 

In 2009, his Collected Critical Writings won the Truman Capote Award for Literary Criticism, the largest annual cash prize in English-language literary criticism.

Hill was created a Knight Bachelor in the 2012 New Year Honours for services to literature.

Oxford candidacy
In March 2010 Hill was confirmed as a candidate in the election of the Professor of Poetry in the University of Oxford, with a broad base of academic support. He was ultimately successful, and delivered his 15 lectures in the academic years 2010 to 2015. The lectures progressed chronologically, beginning with Shakespeare's sonnets and concluding with a critique of Philip Larkin's poem "Church Going".

Writing
Hill's poetry encompasses a variety of styles, from the dense and allusive writing of King Log (1968) and Canaan (1997) through the simplified syntax of the sequence "The Pentecost Castle" in Tenebrae (1978), on to the more accessible poems of Mercian Hymns (1971), a series of 30 poems (sometimes called "prose-poems", a label which Hill rejects in favour of "versets") which juxtapose the history of Offa, eighth-century ruler of the Anglo-Saxon kingdom of Mercia, with Hill's own childhood in the modern Mercia of the West Midlands. Seamus Heaney said of Hill: "He has a strong sense of the importance of the maintenance of speech, a deep scholarly sense of the religious and political underpinning of everything in Britain." 

Kenneth Haynes, editor of Broken Hierarchies, commented: "the annotation is not the hard part with Hill's poems... the difficulty only begins after looking things up". Elegy is Hill's dominant mode; he is a poet of phrases rather than cadences. Regarding both his style and subject, Hill is often described as a "difficult" poet. In an interview in The Paris Review (2000), which published Hill's early poem "Genesis" when he was still at Oxford, Hill defended the right of poets to difficulty as a form of resistance to the demeaning simplifications imposed by 'maestros of the world'. 

Hill was consistently drawn to morally problematic and violent episodes in British and European history and has written poetic responses to the Holocaust in English, "Two Formal Elegies", "September Song" and "Ovid in the Third Reich". His accounts of landscape (especially that of his native Worcestershire) are as intense as his encounters with history. Hill has also worked in theatre – in 1978, the National Theatre in London staged his 'version for the English stage' of Brand by Henrik Ibsen, written in rhyming verse. Hill's distaste for conclusion, however, has led him, in 2000's Speech! Speech! (118), to scorn the following argument as a glib get-out: 'ACCESSIBLE / traded as DEMOCRATIC, he answers / as he answers móst things these days | easily.' Throughout his corpus Hill is uncomfortable with the muffling of truth-telling that verse designed to sound well, for its contrivances of harmony, must permit. The constant buffets of Hill's suspicion of lyric eloquence—can it truly be eloquent?—against his talent for it (in Syon, a sky is 'livid with unshed snow') become in the poems a sort of battle in style, where passages of singing force (ToL: 'The ferns / are breast-high, head-high, the days / lustrous, with their hinterlands of thunder') are balanced with prosaic ones of academese and inscrutable syntax. In the long interview collected in Haffenden's Viewpoints there is described the poet warring himself to witness honestly, to make language as tool say truly what he believes is true of the world.

Criticism
The violence of Hill's aesthetic has been criticised by the Irish poet-critic Tom Paulin, who draws attention to the poet's use of the Virgilian trope of 'rivers of blood' – as deployed infamously by Enoch Powell – to suggest that despite Hill's multi-layered irony and techniques of reflection, his lyrics draw their energies from an outmoded nationalism, expressed in what Hugh Haughton has described as a 'language of the past largely invented by the Victorians'. Yet as Raphael Ingelbien notes, "Hill's England ... is a landscape which is fraught with the traces of a history that stretches so far back that it relativizes the Empire and its aftermath". Harold Bloom has called him "the strongest British poet now active."

For his part, Hill addressed some of the misperceptions about his political and cultural beliefs in a Guardian interview in 2002. There he suggested that his affection for the "radical Tories" of the 19th century, while recently misunderstood as reactionary, was actually evidence of a progressive bent tracing back to his working-class roots. He also indicated that he could no longer draw a firm distinction between "Blairite Labour" and the Thatcher-era Conservatives, lamenting that both parties had become solely oriented toward "materialism".

Hill's style has been subjected to parody: Wendy Cope includes a two-stanza parody of the Mercian Hymns entitled "Duffa Rex" in Making Cocoa for Kingsley Amis.

Bibliography

Books of poems
 Geoffrey Hill. Oxford: Fantasy Press, 1952. "The Fantasy Poets," no. 11. 8 pp.
 For the Unfallen: Poems 1952-1958. London: Andre Deutsch, 1959.
 Preghiere. Leeds: School of English, University of Leeds, 1964. "Northern House Pamphlets Poets" series. Contains 8 poems, all of which were subsequently published in King Log.
 King Log. London: Andre Deutsch,1968.
 Mercian Hymns. London: Andre Deutsch, 1971.
 Tenebrae. London: Andre Deutsch, 1978,
 The Mystery of the Charity of Charles Péguy. London: Agenda Editions /Andre Deutsch, 1983.
 Canaan. London: Penguin, 1996.
 The Triumph of Love. London: Penguin, 1997.
 Speech! Speech!  Washington, DC: Counterpoint, 2000. Long poem, comprising 120 12-line stanzas
 The Orchards of Syon. Washington DC: Counterpoint, 2002.
 Scenes from Comus. London: Penguin, 2005.
 A Treatise of Civil Power. Thame: Clutag Press, 2005. Limited edition of 400 copies.
 Without Title. London: Penguin, 2006. New Haven: Yale University Press, 2007, .
 A Treatise of Civil Power (London: Penguin, 2007. (“In Penguin’s new printing, a number of the book’s other poems survive intact, but the "Treatise" has been smashed up, rewritten (or sub-edited) into a number of smaller poems and fragmentary lyrics. Then other stuff’s gone in as well.”  Tim Martin, The Guardian (8 Sept. 2007)
 Oraclau | Oracles: The Daybooks III. Thame: Clutag Press, 2010. 
 Clavics: The Daybooks IV. London: Enitharmon Press, 2011.
 Odi Barbare: The Daybooks II. Thame: Clutag Press, 2012.
  (Posthumous)

Poetry collections and selections

Somewhere Is Such a Kingdom: Poems 1952-1971, introduction by Harold Bloom. Boston: Houghton Mifflin, 1975. (Contains For the Unfallen (1959), King Log (1968), Mercian Hymns (1971)
Edwin Brock /Geoffrey Hill /Stevie Smith. Penguin Modern Poets, 8.  Harmondsworth: Penguin, 1966
Collected Poems. Harmondsworth: Penguin, 1985. 1st hardback edition, London: André Deutsch, 1986.
New & Collected Poems, 1952-1992.  Boston: Houghton Mifflin, 1994.
Selected Poems. Harmondsworth: Penguin, 2006.  1st hardback edition, New Haven: Yale University Press, 2010. Published 1 April.
Broken Hierarchies: Poems 1952-2012, ed. Kenneth Haynes. Oxford: Oxford University Press, 2013.  Published November. Includes all published collections, and four hitherto unpublished sections of “The Daybooks”: a) Ludo: Epigraphs and Colophons to The Daybooks, b) I.  Expostulations on the Volcano, c) II.  Liber Illustrium Virorum, d) VI.  Al Tempo de’ Tremuoti

Prose and drama

 Brand, by Henrik Ibsen: A Version for the English Stage, trans. Geoffrey Hill. 1978.
 The Lords of Limit: Essays on Literature and Ideas. London: Andre Deutsch, 1984.
 The Enemy's Country: Words, Contexture, and other Circumstances of Language. Stanford University Press, 1991.
 Style and Faith (2003)
 Collected Critical Writings, ed. Kenneth Haynes. Oxford: Oxford University Press, 2008

Notes

Further reading

External links

Oxford Professor of Poetry Faculty Page featuring Hill's Lectures

 
 "Geoffrey Hill: Unparalleled Atonement" Review Selected Poems in The Critical Flame.
 Profile at Poets.org 
 Profile and poems at Poetry Foundation 
 Guardian profile of Hill, celebrating his 70th birthday
 BBC 18 June 2010 "Geoffrey Hill named Oxford poetry professor" 
 Hill on the 'beautiful energy' of his poetry
 'Subduing the reader' by Laurie Smith in Magma, No. 23, Summer 2002
 'Language and Grace', review of The Orchards of Syon in the Oxonian Review
 'The Violent Bear it Away' Audio recording of a lecture on English translations of the Bible given at Sidney Sussex College, Cambridge.
 Archival material at 

People from Bromsgrove
People from Bromsgrove District
Formalist poets
Alumni of Keble College, Oxford
Fellows of Keble College, Oxford
Fellows of the American Academy of Arts and Sciences
Fellows of the Royal Society of Literature
Fellows of Emmanuel College, Cambridge
1932 births
2016 deaths
Knights Bachelor
Academics of the University of Leeds
Oxford Professors of Poetry
English male poets
20th-century English poets
21st-century English poets
21st-century English male writers
20th-century English male writers
Writers from Worcestershire